The 1923 Paris–Tours was the 18th edition of the Paris–Tours cycle race and was held on 13 May 1923. The race started in Paris and finished in Tours. The race was won by Paul Deman.

General classification

References

1923 in French sport
1923
May 1923 sports events